Dean Anthony Minors (born 6 January 1970) is a former Bermudian international cricketer.

He played as wicketkeeper with the Bermuda national cricket team in their first One Day International when they played Canada on 17 May 2006. Minors scored 46 runs, made two catches and two stumpings as Bermuda won the game by three wickets under the Duckworth–Lewis method, and he won the man of the match award as well.

He played in 20 ODIs, with a highest score of 74. He has also played for Bermuda in six ICC Intercontinental Cup matches, and in ICC Trophy tournaments.

References

External links
 

1970 births
Living people
People from Hamilton, Bermuda
Bermudian cricketers
Bermuda One Day International cricketers
Wicket-keepers